Brandon is the second-largest city in the province of Manitoba, Canada. It is the primary hub of trade and commerce for the Westman Region as well as parts of southeastern Saskatchewan and northern North Dakota, an area with a combined population of over 180,000 people.

The City of Brandon was incorporated in 1882, having a history rooted in the Assiniboine River fur trade as well as its role as a major junction on the Canadian Pacific Railway. Known as The Wheat City, Brandon's economy is predominantly associated with agriculture, as well as health care, manufacturing, food processing, education, business services, and transportation.

Brandon's post-secondary institutions include Brandon University, Assiniboine Community College, Robertson College, and the Manitoba Emergency Services College. Brandon's Keystone Centre, one of the largest consolidated entertainment, recreation, convention, and agriculture complexes in Canada, is the home of the Brandon Wheat Kings and the Royal Manitoba Winter Fair.

History
Prior to the influx of people from Eastern Canada, the area around Brandon was primarily used by the Sioux people, the Bungays, the Yellow Quills, and the Bird Tails. In the 1870s and early 1880s, the Plains Bison were nearly wiped out by over-hunting. With the destruction of their staff of life, the buffalo, the nomadic Sioux people began to agree to settle in reservations such as the Sioux Valley Dakota Nation, or left the area entirely.

French Canadians also passed through the area on river boats on their way to the Hudson Bay Post, Fort Ellice located near present-day St. Lazare, Manitoba. The city of Brandon gets its name from the Blue Hills south of the city, which got their name from a Hudson's Bay trading post known as Brandon House, which got its name from a hill on an island in James Bay where Captain James had anchored his ship in 1631.

During the 1870s it was believed by most that the transcontinental railway would take a northwesterly direction from Portage la Prairie. Many thought that the route would most likely go through either Minnedosa or Rapid City, Manitoba because they were both located at natural river crossings. Rapid City was the front runner for the site of the new railway and had prepared for the impending building boom accordingly. But suddenly, in 1881, the builders of the railway decided to take a more westerly route from Winnipeg, towards Grand Valley. Grand Valley was located on the northern side of the Assiniboine, opposite the side of the river where present-day Brandon sits.

Grand Valley was originally settled by two brothers John and Dougal McVicar, and their families. With the expectation of the new railroad, settlers and prospectors now rushed to an area they had previously avoided.

Meanwhile, in Grand Valley with the promise of the railway, the town began to boom. Regular voyages were made by steam sternwheelers to the city, each bringing more and more settlers. In the spring of 1881, General Thomas L. Rosser, Chief Engineer of the Canadian Pacific Railway arrived in Grand Valley. It was Rosser's job to choose the townsites for the railway. Rosser approached Dougald McVicar of Grand Valley and offered him $25,000 for the railway in Grand Valley. McVicar countered with $50,000 to which Rosser replied that "I'll be damned if a town of any kind is ever built here". So the site was then moved to a site just west of today's current First Street bridge in Brandon. A shanty had been built there by a man named J.D. Adamson, and it was on this quarter section Adamson claimed that Rosser chose as the townsite for the CPR Railway and named Brandon.
After the location of the railway was once again changed, there was still hope that Grand Valley could become a rival neighbour to Brandon. But late in June 1881 it became clear that Grand Valley would not have lasted as a city long term. A flood hit in late June, and as the city was built on a low-lying part of the river, flooded quickly and dramatically. Because Grand Valley was built on a low flood plain, and Brandon was built on the heights on the other side, it became apparent that Brandon was the best place for a city in the area.

Rosser had chosen Brandon as the townsite in May 1881, within a year settlers had flocked to Brandon in such numbers that it was incorporated as a city. Brandon never spent any time as a town or village but has only existed as a city.

An internment camp was set up at the Exhibition Building in Brandon from September 1914 to July 1916. Post World War II, Brandon experienced a minor disaster when an explosion at the Manitoba Power Commission's steam plant caused the 40 metre (130 ft) brick chimney to collapse, killing two workers in the process.

In contemporary times, Shari Decter Hirst defeated incumbent Dave Burgess in the 2010 municipal election to become the first female mayor of the city.

Geography

Brandon is located in south-western Manitoba, on the banks of the Assiniboine river. It is located in the Canadian Prairies and resides in the aspen parkland ecoregion of the prairies. The terrain is generally flat and rolling surrounding Brandon, and there is a large valley located within the city. The Brandon hills are located to the southeast, from which Brandon got its name.

Climate
Brandon has a dry continental climate (Köppen Dfb, USDA Plant Hardiness Zone 2b) with warm, sometimes hot summers and cold, dry winters. There is measurable rainfall on 56.0 days throughout the year, and 38.8 days with snowfall. Snow falls from October to April; however, snow has fallen as late as May and as early as September.

General seasons
 Winter: November to March
 Spring: April to May
 Summer: June to August
 Fall: September to October

Demographics 

The median age is 36.3 years old which is almost 5 years younger than the national average at 41.2 years old. There are 22,526 dwellings in Brandon with an occupancy rate of 94.1%, and the median cost of a dwelling at $264,781, much lower than the national average at $341,556.

As far as education goes, for those between 25 and 64 years old, 57.0% have a post-secondary schooling degree, 29.8% have a high school degree (or equivalent) and 13.2% have no certificates, diplomas or degrees. The unemployment rate is 7.3% in Brandon, lower than the national average at 7.7%. The median household income before taxes is $65,960, and after taxes at $57,008.

As of 2016, 88.8% of Brandon's residents are Canadian citizens. About 5.5% of residents are recent immigrants (from 2011 to 2016). Brandon is 70.1% white, 16.3% visible minorities and 13.6% aboriginal. The largest visible minority groups in Brandon are Latin American (5.0%), Chinese (3.8%), South Asian (3.0%), Black (2.1%) and Filipino (1.1%).

English is the mother tongue of 80.3% of residents. Other common first languages were Spanish (4.5%), Chinese Languages (3.2%) French (1.3%), Ukrainian (1.3%), Gujarati (1.2%), and German (1.2%).

The 2021 census found that English was the mother tongue of 80.6% of the population. The next most common mother tongues were Spanish (4.2%), Gujarati (2.8%), Mandarin (2.0%), French (1.4%), Tagalog (1.2%), Ukrainian (1.1%), Punjabi (0.9%), German (0.7%), Cantonese (0.7%), Amharic (0.7%), Yoruba (0.4%), Russian (0.4%), Tigrigna (0.4%), Arabic (0.3%), Cree (0.2%), Hindi (0.2%), Korean (0.2%), and Urdu (0.2%).

Education

Public schools in Brandon are governed by the Brandon School Division #40. There are approximately 7200 students, 900 staff, 22 schools and a budget exceeding $50 million. There are five high schools: Vincent Massey High School, Crocus Plains Regional Secondary School, and Neelin High School, Prairie Hope (formerly Neelin High School Off-Campus) and Sioux Valley High School. Brandon is also home to four post-secondary institutions: Brandon University, Assiniboine Community College, Robertson College, as well as the Manitoba Emergency Services College.

Sports

Local teams
 Brandon University Bobcats (Basketball/CWUAA)
 Brandon University Bobcats (Volleyball/CWUAA)
 Brandon Wheat Kings (Hockey/Western Hockey League)
 Wheat City Whiskey Jacks (Baseball/Expedition League)

Major sporting events
 The Brier – Canadian Men's Curling Championship (1963, 1982, 2019)
 U-18 Baseball World Cup - International U-18 Baseball Competition (1991, 1994)
 The Scott Tournament of Hearts – Canadian Women's Curling Championship (1993, 2002)
 World Curling Championship – Men's & Women's World Curling Championship (1995)
 Canadian Olympic Curling Trials – Men's & Women's Olympic Curling Trials (1997)
 Canada Winter Games – Canada Winter Games (1979)
 Canada Summer Games – Canada Summer Games (1997)
 Special Olympics Canada – Canada Special Olympics Summer Games (2006)
 Memorial Cup - MasterCard Memorial Cup (2010)

Sports venues
 Keystone Centre
 Brandon Community Sportsplex
 Andrews Field
 Ashley Neufeld Softball Complex

Infrastructure

Transportation

 Brandon is serviced by Brandon Municipal Airport.
 Rider Express provide intercity bus service from Regina and Winnipeg once a week, also Brandon Air Shuttle provide bus service from Winnipeg Airport 4 times a day. 
 Taxi service is available from numerous local taxi companies.
 The city of Brandon runs Brandon Transit, which provides daily bus service throughout the city, with 10 routes that operate seven days a week.
 Brandon has a system of walking/bike trails throughout the city.
 The Canadian Pacific Railway runs through Brandon; the station is a historic landmark.
 Cando Rail & Terminals is headquartered in Brandon.

Utilities
Water and sewage services are provided by the City of Brandon. The city draws water from the Assiniboine River where it is then treated and fluoridated at the community's water treatment plant on McDonald Avenue. The Assiniboine River's flow is regulated by the Shellmouth Dam in order to ensure that communities on the river have adequate water supply. Brandon has two emergency groundwater wells to supply water in the event of an emergency situation with water supply or if there are issues with water turbidity or elevated organic water hardness. Like nearly every community in Manitoba, electricity is 98% hydro generated and supplied by Manitoba Hydro. The Brandon Generating Station was a coal powered plant that operated until about 2018. It is now natural gas fueled and runs only as a synchronous condenser to regulate grid voltage in southwest Manitoba.

Media

The Brandon Sun publishes daily newspapers.

Music and the arts

Brandon hosts many art festivals every year, including the Brandon Festival of the Arts, Brandon Jazz Festival, and the Brandon Folk Music Festival. In addition to the music festivals, the Brandon University School of Music hosts the annual 'Pro Series' which has included guests like Bob Brookmeyer, George Crumb, and the Winnipeg Symphony Orchestra. In 2009, Brandon hosted the Western Canadian Music Awards.

The "Words Alive" was a yearly literary festival held in downtown Brandon, from 2007-2010. Authors that participated in this festival included Robert J. Sawyer, Maggie Siggins, Fred Stenson and Corey Redekop.

Some of the local arts venues include the Western Manitoba Centennial Auditorium, Lorne Watson Recital Hall, Evans Theatre, and the Art Gallery of Southwestern Manitoba.

Events and exhibitions
 The Provincial Exhibition of Manitoba is a non-profit organization established in 1872, which is now housed at the city's extensive Keystone Centre complex. It hosts
 Royal Manitoba Winter Fair (March)
 Manitoba Summer Fair (June)
 Manitoba Livestock Expo (November)
 AgDays – Canada's largest indoor agricultural trade show and program, and one of the premier shows of its kind in North America. Held in mid January each year at Brandon's Keystone Centre.
 Brandon Folk Music and Arts Festival is a weekend event held annually in late July. The festival is held outdoors on the grounds of the Keystone Centre.
 The Commonwealth Air Training Plan Museum, located at the Brandon Municipal Airport.

Notable people

 Roy Sydney Baker-Falkner – World War II naval aviator and Battle of Britain pilot
 William Otway Boger – World War I flying ace
 Turk Broda – ice hockey player
 Samuel Bronfman – businessman
 Larry Brown – ice hockey player
 Michael Cain – pianist
 Matt Calvert – hockey player
 Kristen Campbell – ice hockey player
 Joseph Donaldson – politician
 Tommy Douglas – politician
 Douglas Durkin – writer
 Joel Edmundson – ice hockey player
 James Ehnes – violinist
 Bill Fairbairn – hockey player
 Gathie Falk – artist
 Trent Frayne – sportswriter
 Glen Hanlon – ice hockey player
 Dan Halldorson – professional golfer
 Charles Hefferon – South African athlete
 Jerry Hemmings – basketball coach
 Ron Hextall – ice hockey player
 Douglas Hill – science fiction author
 William G. Hobbs – artist
 Edna Mayne Hull – writer
 Israel Idonije - NFL football player
 Stanley Knowles – politician
 Keegan Kolesar – ice hockey player
 Greg Leskiw – guitarist for The Guess Who
 Kavavaow Mannomee – artist
 Jordan Martinook - hockey player
 John Mayhew – cricket player
 Brad Maxwell – hockey player
 Leslie McDorman – politician
 James Duncan McGregor – agriculturalist
 Daren Millard – sportscaster
 Kelsey Mitchell – cyclist
 Mae Moore – musician
 Martha Ostenso – writer
 Art Ross – hockey player and executive
 Karl Schroeder – science fiction author
 Damon Severson – ice hockey player
 Haroon Siddiqui – journalist
 Amanda Stott – musician
 Andrew Unger – writer
 J.S. Woodsworth – minister
 Ken Wregget – hockey player

See also 
HMCS Brandon
26th Field Artillery Regiment, Royal Canadian Artillery
St. Matthew's Anglican Cathedral, Brandon

References

External links

 

 
Cities in Manitoba
Hudson's Bay Company trading posts
Populated places established in 1882